is a Japanese actress, TV personality, and fashion model. She is known for her roles as Kaede Kayano in Assassination Classroom, Chiyomi Horikiri in the 2015 television drama Minami-kun no Koibito, and Mizuki Kurata in the 2018 film adaptation of the manga series After the Rain, among others.

Biography
Yamamoto was born in 1997 in Tottori Prefecture, Japan, and made her entertainment debut as the 14th Mitsui ReHouse Girl in 2011. Her first acting role came in 2011 in the Fuji TV series Soredemo, Ikite Yuku. At the age of 15 she moved to Tokyo to attend private high school while pursuing an acting career. In 2015 she played the role of Kaede Kayano in Assassination Classroom, the film adaptation of Yūsei Matsui's manga. That same year she played the lead role of Chiyomi Horikiri, a young dancer and writer who shrinks in size, in the 2015 Fuji TV adaptation of the Shungicu Uchida manga Minami-kun no Koibito.

Yamamoto was an exclusive model for nicola as a teenager. Her first photobook was published by Kodansha in March 2018.

Filmography

Films

Television dramas

Dubbing
 Bullet Train, The Prince (Joey King)

References

External links

 
 at Biz 

1997 births
Living people
Actors from Tottori Prefecture
Japanese television actresses
Japanese film actresses
Japanese television personalities
Japanese female models
People from Yonago, Tottori
Models from Tottori Prefecture